Chuck Porter may refer to:

Chuck Porter (baseball) (born 1955), American player in Major League Baseball
Chuck Porter (politician) (born 1964), Canadian politician
Chuck Porter (executive), American advertising executive, marketer and author

See also
Charles Porter (disambiguation)